United Nations Security Council resolution 847, adopted unanimously on 30 June 1993, after reaffirming Resolution 743 (1992) and subsequent resolutions relating to the United Nations Protection Force (UNPROFOR), the council condemned military attacks in Croatia and Bosnia and Herzegovina and extended the mandate of UNPROFOR until 30 September 1993.

The importance of seeking political solutions to the various conflicts in the territory of the former Yugoslavia was stressed, and of ensuring confidence and stability in the Republic of Macedonia. The territorial integrity of member states where the peacekeeping force was deployed was also reaffirmed by the council. The resolution also called on all parties and others concerned to reach an agreement on confidence-building measures in Croatia, including the opening of a railroad between Zagreb and the coastal city of Split, the highway between Zagreb and Županja, and the Adriatic oil pipeline, securing the uninterrupted traffic across the Maslenica straits, and restoring the supply of electricity and water to all regions in Croatia and the United Nations Protected Areas.

The council announced its determination for the safety and freedom of movement of UNPROFOR, acting under Chapter VII of the United Nations Charter, its mandate was extended and the Secretary-General Boutros Boutros-Ghali was requested to report back on the implementation of the current resolution.

See also
 Bosnian War
 Breakup of Yugoslavia
 Croatian War of Independence
 List of United Nations Security Council Resolutions 801 to 900 (1993–1994)
 Yugoslav Wars

References

External links
 
Text of the Resolution at undocs.org

 0847
 0847
1993 in Yugoslavia
1993 in Bosnia and Herzegovina
 0847
 0847
 0847
 0847
June 1993 events